The Catholic–Orthodox Joint Declaration of 1965 was read out on 7 December 1965 simultaneously at a public meeting of the Second Vatican Council in Rome and at a special ceremony in Istanbul. It withdrew the exchange of excommunications between prominent ecclesiastics in the Holy See and the Ecumenical Patriarchate of Constantinople, commonly known as the Great Schism of  1054.  It did not end the schism but showed a desire for greater reconciliation between the two churches, represented by Pope Paul VI and Ecumenical Patriarch Athenagoras I. The document and accompanying texts are also referred to as 'Tomos Agapes' ('Document of Love').

Many Orthodox reacted negatively to the declaration. Metropolitan Philaret of the Russian Orthodox Church Abroad openly challenged the Patriarch's efforts at rapprochement with the Roman Catholic Church, claiming that it would inevitably lead to heresy, in his 1965 epistle to the Patriarch. The monks at Mount Athos reportedly excluded Athenagoras from their daily prayers after the declaration.

See also
 Joint Declaration of Pope Francis and Bishop Munib Younan

References

External links
 Catholic-Orthodox joint declaration of 1965 (from the Vatican site)

1965 in Italy
1965 in Turkey
1960s in Rome
East–West Schism
1965 documents
20th-century Christian texts
20th-century Catholicism
Catholic–Eastern Orthodox ecumenism
20th-century Eastern Orthodoxy
1965 in Christianity
1960s in Istanbul